Oneida FC (Oneida Football Club) is a soccer club based in Cambridge, Massachusetts. The organisation was estabished in 2011 and plays its home games at East Boston Memorial Stadium, owned by the city of Boston. The field also hosts American football and baseball games.

In the past, Oneida had a rugby league team which was dissolved in 2013. It played in the USA Rugby League (USARL) from 2011 to 2012 before pausing their operations. The team played their home games at Henry G. Steinbrenner '27 Stadium on the campus of the Massachusetts Institute of Technology. 

In 2020 a separate organization, "Oneida County Football Club", was started in Utica, Oneida County, NY. They feature youth soccer teams. On June 4, 2022 the 2010 birth year team played there final tournament winning the prestigious Northstars Cup. There currently is a 2011–12 team.

History

Rugby League
The Oneida FC rugby league club was established in 2011 as a charter member of the newly announced USA Rugby League, which was formed by teams that had left the established American National Rugby League (AMNRL). The team was named in honor of the Oneida Football Club, the first ever organized football team in the United States, which operated from 1862–1865. Together with the New Jersey Turnpike Titans and the Rhode Island Rebellion, they were one of three new teams to join the league.

The club operated under the leadership the USARL's other Boston-based team, the Boston Thirteens, but competed as a separate team. The establishment of Oneida FC put two USARL teams in Boston, and four in New England, an arrangement that lowered operating costs. The team struggled on the field in their inaugural season but found success in recruiting players from other sports.

Oneida finished the 2012 season in sixth place, missing the playoffs. They were initially announced to compete in 2013, but withdrew before the season, along with the New Haven Warriors.

Oneida FC played all home games at Henry G. Steinbrenner '27 Stadium at the Massachusetts Institute of Technology.

Soccer
The organization also fielded an amateur soccer team under the "Oneida FC" banner in the Casa Soccer League of Boston, where they won the championship in 2011.  They moved to the Bay State Soccer League (BSSL) in 2013, where they currently compete in Division 2.

USARL season summaries

See also
 List of defunct rugby league clubs in the United States

References

External links
 
 
 Official website (archived, 8 Jul 2012)

Association football clubs established in 2011
Rugby clubs established in 2011
‎Category:Soccer clubs in Massachusetts
Rugby league in Massachusetts
USA Rugby League teams
Boston rugby league clubs